The Bočac Hydro Power Plant is one of Bosnia and Herzegovina's largest hydro power plant having an installed electric capacity of 110 MW.

References

Hydroelectric power stations in Bosnia and Herzegovina